The sixth season of Colombian reality singing contest La Voz Kids aired on July 18 in Caracol Television. Andrés Cepeda is the only coach who returned from previous season, while joined by the new coaches, Puerto Rican singer Kany García and Venezuelan Nacho who replacing Jesús Navarro and Natalia Jimenez who both departed from the show. 

Laura Acuña remains as the presenter, joined by Iván Lalinde serves as backstage host

Teams

  Winner
  Runner-up
  Third place
  Eliminated in the Semi-final.
   Eliminated in the Súper Battles.
  Eliminated in the Battles

The Blind Auditions 
Each coach has to form its team with twenty-seven contestants. This season, implemented the "Block" button in which allows coaches to block one of the other coaches to prevent them recruiting the contestant on its team. Each coach has given indefinite number of blocks to use during the blinds, and when the blocked coach tries to turn around for the contestant, the chair won't turn.

The Battle Rounds 
The battle rounds began on August 19. During this round, coaches would group their team by trios. At the end of the battle, the coach would choose the winner of the battle to proceed into the next round. The coaches decide with the help of advisors for their teams, Cali y El Dandee for team Nacho, Arelys Henao for team Kany and Alejandro Santamaría for team Cepeda

Super Battles 
In this round, coaches divide the remaining artist from its team to trios and perform a song of their choice. After all artist performed, the coach would choose one artist to proceed to the semi-finals.

Final phase 
In this stage, the 3 participants from each team will sing individually, and the coaches must choose 1 participant who will go on to the grand final.

Semi-final

Grand Final

Elimination chart

Overall 
Color key
Artist's info

Result details

References 

Colombia